Armstrong Frederick "Klondike" Smith (January 4, 1887 – November 15, 1959) was an English born Major League Baseball outfielder.  He started the last seven games of the 1912 season for the New York Highlanders, who were 50–102 and finished in last place in the American League.  The 25-year-old rookie was a native of London.

Smith made his major league debut in a September 28 double-header against the Philadelphia Athletics at Shibe Park.  His last appearance was on October 5 in a home game against the Washington Senators at Hilltop Park.  That was the only game the Highlanders won while Smith was in the lineup.

During his brief time in the big leagues he was 5-for-27 (.185) with one double and one stolen base.  In the field he recorded ten putouts and made no errors.

Smith died at the age of 72 of a heart attack while visiting friends in Springfield, Massachusetts. He is buried in Lawrence, Massachusetts.

References

External links
Baseball Reference
Retrosheet

English baseball players
New York Highlanders players
1887 births
1959 deaths
Major League Baseball center fielders
Major League Baseball players from England
Major League Baseball players from the United Kingdom
Sportspeople from London
Brockton Shoemakers players
Montreal Royals players
Rochester Hustlers players
Springfield Ponies players
Burials in Massachusetts
English expatriate sportspeople in Canada
American expatriate baseball players in Canada